The Local Government (Scotland) Act 1894 (57 & 58 Vict. c. 58) was an Act of the Parliament of the United Kingdom. It created a Local Government Board for Scotland, and replaced existing parochial boards with parish councils.

Part I of the act created the 'Local Government Board for Scotland'.  The board had similar powers to those already established in England, Wales and Ireland.  These included the making of orders effecting boundary changes for local authorities and for allowing them to carry out such functions as water and gas supply, tramways and other ancillary activities.  The president of the board was the Secretary for Scotland.

Part II established a parish council in every parish, while part III of the Act transferred the powers of the abolished parochial boards to the new parish councils.

Finally, part IV gave new powers to landward parishes ("landward" referring to areas outside a burgh), and the landward parts of parishes partly in a burgh to acquire buildings for public offices and lay out recreation grounds.

References

External links
Local Government (Scotland) Act 1894 (c.58) - UK Statute Law Database

History of local government in Scotland
1894 in law
United Kingdom Acts of Parliament 1894
Acts of the Parliament of the United Kingdom concerning Scotland
1894 in Scotland
Repealed Scottish legislation